is a railway station on the Nemuro Main Line of JR Hokkaido located in Takikawa, Hokkaidō, Japan. The station opened on November 10, 1913.

Railway stations in Hokkaido Prefecture
Stations of Hokkaido Railway Company
Railway stations in Japan opened in 1913
Takikawa, Hokkaido